Nazneen is a given name. Notable people with the name include:

Nazneen Contractor (born 1982), Indian-born Canadian actress
Nazneen Ghaani (active 2005–2014), Indian actress
Nazneen Patel (born 1945), Indian actress
Nazneen Rahman, British geneticist